Ranjit Karna is a Nepalese politician, belonging to the Nepali Congress. Karna is the former member of the Constituent Assembly. Karna is also the former president of Nepal Students Union, the student wing of Nepali Congress.

Reference 

Year of birth missing (living people)
Living people
Nepali Congress politicians from Madhesh Province
21st-century Nepalese politicians
Members of the 2nd Nepalese Constituent Assembly